6 Pashons - Coptic calendar - 8 Pashons

Fixed commemorations
All fixed commemorations below are observed on 7 Pashons (15 May) by the Coptic Orthodox Church.

Saints
Pope Athanasius the Apostolic (373 A.D.)

Days of the Coptic calendar